Glomar Challenger was a deep sea research and scientific drilling vessel for oceanography and marine geology studies. The drillship was designed by Global Marine Inc. (now Transocean Inc.) specifically for a long term contract with the American National Science Foundation and University of California Scripps Institution of Oceanography and built by Levingston Shipbuilding Company in Orange, Texas. Launched on March 23, 1968, the vessel was owned and operated by the Global Marine Inc. corporation. Glomar Challenger was given its name as a tribute to the accomplishments of the oceanographic survey vessel . Glomar is a truncation of Global Marine.

Accomplishments 
Starting from August 1968, the ship was embarked on a 15-year-long scientific expedition, the Deep Sea Drilling Program, criss-crossing the Mid-Atlantic Ridge between South America and Africa and drilling core samples at specific locations. When the age of the samples was determined by paleontologic and isotopic dating studies, this provided conclusive evidence for the seafloor spreading hypothesis, and, consequently, for plate tectonics.

During 1970, when doing research in the Mediterranean Sea while supervised by Kenneth Hsu, geologists aboard the vessel brought up drill cores containing gypsum, anhydrite, rock salt, and various other evaporite minerals that often form from drying of brine or seawater. These were the first solid evidence for the ancient desiccation of the Mediterranean Sea, the Messinian salinity crisis.

Scrapping 
After being operated for fifteen years, Glomar Challenger'''s active duty was ended during November 1983 and she was later scrapped. Her successor, JOIDES Resolution, was launched during 1985. The ship was a success in collecting rock samples and helped to confirm the Messinian Salinity Crisis theory.

 Purpose  Glomar Challenger was made to help Harry Hess with the theory of Seafloor Spreading by taking rock samples confirming that the farther from the Mid-ocean ridge, the older the rock was.

See also
 Mediterranean Sea
 Scientific drilling
 Continental Drift
 GSF Explorer, formerly USNS Glomar Explorer'' (T-AG-193)
 Harry Hess

References
Notes

Bibliography
  (About the campaign that discovered the salt residues under the Mediterranean.)

External links 

 Glomar Challenger: Drillship of the Deep Sea Drilling Project
  Ships of the World: Glomar Challenger 
 USGS CMG Platform (Glomar Challenger) Data and Metadata

Research vessels of the United States
1968 ships
Ships built in Orange, Texas